Brenda Sempare (born 9 November 1961) is an English former international women's footballer. She played in all four games of England's 1995 FIFA Women's World Cup appearance.

Club career
Sempare helped Friends of Fulham win the 1985 FA Women's Cup. In November 2001 Hope Powell wrote in The Times that Sempare's performance in 1985's 2–0 final win over Doncaster Belles at Craven Cottage was "the best all-round performance I have ever seen."

In April 1996, Sempare was one of Croydon Ladies' penalty scorers as Croydon beat Liverpool Ladies on penalties in the FA Women's Cup final at The New Den. The following month goals from Sempare and Kerry Davis earned a 2–1 league win over Arsenal Ladies, which sealed a domestic double for Croydon.

Sempare retired at the end of that 1995–96 season, but returned to action during 1996–97. On 23 September 2010, she was inducted into the English Football Hall of Fame.

International career
While working as a postwoman Sempare helped England reach the semi-final of the 1987 European Competition for Women's Football, where they lost 3–2 to Sweden after extra time. She had also featured in the 1984 tournament, where England reached the final.

Sempare also played for England at the 1995 World Cup.

References

1961 births
Living people
English women's footballers
Fulham L.F.C. players
Charlton Athletic W.F.C. players
England women's international footballers
English Football Hall of Fame inductees
FA Women's National League players
1995 FIFA Women's World Cup players
Women's association football midfielders